This is a list of angels in fiction. For angels in theology, see the list of theological angels.

A
Abdiel (Paradise Lost and other fiction)
Abner (Supernatural)
Adina (Supernatural)
Ainur (J. R. R. Tolkien's The Silmarillion)
Alexiel (Angel Sanctuary)
Alice Angel (Bendy and the Ink Machine)
Amelia Harvey (Casper)
Amenadiel (Lucifer as comic-book and TV-series)
Anael (Supernatural)
Angel (Monica's Gang)
Akobel (Supernatural)
Angela (Spawn)
Anna Milton (Supernatural)
Apollyon (The Binding of Isaac: Afterbirth+)
Asmodel (DC Comics)
Aulë (J. R. R. Tolkien's The Silmarillion)
Auriel (Diablo and Heroes of the Storm)
Authority, The (His Dark Materials)
Azazeal (Hex)
Aziraphale (Good Omens)

B
Bagwis (Filipino comic book superhero)
Balrogs (J. R. R. Tolkien's The Silmarillion and The Lord of the Rings)
Balthamos (His Dark Materials)
Balthazar (Supernatural)
Bartholomew (Supernatural)
Baruch (His Dark Materials)
Benjamin (Supernatural)
Billie (Supernatural)
Blue Wizards (J. R. R. Tolkien's Unfinished Tales )
Bootsy (Spawn)

C
Castiel (Supernatural)
Celestine (Image Comics)
Clara Oddbody (It Happened One Christmas)
Clarence Odbody (It's a Wonderful Life)
Constantine (Supernatural)
Conrad (Supernatural)
Cupidon (Cupidon)
Celestia

D
Daniel (Supernatural)
Daniel Grigori (Fallen Series)
DeBlanc (Preacher as comic-book and TV-series)
 The Disciple (Spawn)
Duma (The Sandman and Lucifer)
Duma (Supernatural)
Durin's Bane (J. R. R. Tolkien's The Lord of the Rings)

E
Efram (Supernatural)
Elijah (Supernatural)
Eönwë (J. R. R. Tolkien's The Silmarillion)
Esper (Supernatural)
Estë (J. R. R. Tolkien's The Silmarillion)
Esther (Supernatural)
Ezekiel (Supernatural)

F
Felicia Aldreen (Dominion)
Fiore (Preacher as comic-book and TV-series)
Flagstaff (Supernatural)
Furiad (Dominion)
Faith

G
Gabriel (The Binding of Isaac: Rebirth)
Gabriel (Dominion and Legion)
Gabriel (Hellblazer and Constantine)
Gabriel (The Prophecy)
Gabriel (Supernatural)
Gabriel (Ultrakill)
Gadreel (Supernatural)
Gabrielle (Spawn)
Gail (Supernatural)
Gandalf (J. R. R. Tolkien's The Lord of the Rings and The Hobbit)
Godsend (Spawn)
Gosei Angels (Tensou Sentai Goseiger)
Gothmog (J. R. R. Tolkien's The Silmarillion)
 Galaxia

H
Hael (Supernatural)
Hannah (Supernatural)
Hester (Supernatural)

I
Imogen (Constantine)
Imperius (Diablo and Heroes of the Storm)
Inarius (Diablo)
Indra (Supernatural)
Ingrid (Supernatural)
Inias (Supernatural)
Ion (Supernatural)
Ishim (Supernatural)
Islington (Neverwhere as novel and TV-series) 
Itherael (Diablo)
Ithuriel (Paradise Lost and other fiction)
Izual (Diablo)

J
Jessica (Supernatural)
Jonah (Supernatural)
Joshua (Supernatural)
Joshua (The World Ends With You)
Josiah (Supernatural)

K
Kelvin (Supernatural)
Khan Maykr (Doom video game series)

L
Liandra (Fallen Angel)
Lily (Supernatural)
Lórien (J. R. R. Tolkien's The Silmarillion)
Louis (Dominion)
Lucifer (Dominion) 
Lucifer (Supernatural)
Lucifer Samael Morningstar (The Sandman and Lucifer as comic-book and TV-series)
Lyrae (Dominion)
Lunar

M
Maiar (J. R. R. Tolkien's The Silmarillion and The Lord of the Rings)
Malachi (Supernatural)
Malthael (Diablo and Heroes of the Storm)
Mandos (J. R. R. Tolkien's The Silmarillion)
Manny (Constantine)
Manwë (J. R. R. Tolkien's The Silmarillion)
Maribel (Supernatural)
Melanie Beeby (Angels Unlimited)
Melian (J. R. R. Tolkien's The Silmarillion)
Melkor, a.k.a. Morgoth (J. R. R. Tolkien's The Silmarillion)
Metatron (His Dark Materials)
Metatron (Supernatural)
Michael (Dominion and Legion)
Michael (Supernatural)
Michael Demiurgos (Lucifer)
 Mike the Messenger (Spawn)
Monica (Touched by an Angel)
Muriel (Supernatural)
Maykrs (Including the Seraphim subspecies) (Doom video game series)

N
Naomi (Supernatural)
Nathaniel (Supernatural)
Nessa (J. R. R. Tolkien's The Silmarillion)
Noma Banks (Dominion)

O
Orion (Sleepy Hollow (TV series))
Oromë (J. R. R. Tolkien's The Silmarillion)
Ossë (J. R. R. Tolkien's The Silmarillion)

P
Panty (Panty and Stocking with Garterbelt)
Pit and Dark Pit (Kid Icarus)
Purah (Supernatural)

R
Rachel (Supernatural)
Radagast (J. R. R. Tolkien's The Lord of the Rings)
Raphael (Dominion)
 Redeemer (Spawn)
Raphael (Shadowmancer)
Raphael (Supernatural)
Raziel (various)
Rebecca (Supernatural)
Remiel (The Sandman and Lucifer)
Roan (Dominion)

S
Samandriel (Supernatural)
Saruman (J. R. R. Tolkien's The Lord of the Rings)
Sauron (J. R. R. Tolkien's The Lord of the Rings and The Silmarillion)
SCP-001, a.k.a. The Gate Guardian (SCP Foundation)
Shaymin (Pokémon)
Simon (The Prophecy)
Sophia (Supernatural)
Stocking (Panty and Stocking with Garterbelt)
Samur Maykr / Dr. Samuel Hayden (Doom video game series)

T
Tamiel (Supernatural)
Tessa (Supernatural)
Thaddeus (Supernatural)
Theo (Supernatural)
Tiffany (Spawn)
Tulkas (J. R. R. Tolkien's The Silmarillion)
Tyrael (Diablo and Heroes of the Storm)

U
Uinen (J. R. R. Tolkien's The Silmarillion)
Ulmo (J. R. R. Tolkien's The Silmarillion)
Uriel (Dominion)
Uriel (Lucifer)
Uriel (Supernatural)
Uriel (The Binding of Isaac: Rebirth)
Usiel (The Prophecy)

V
Vairë (J. R. R. Tolkien's The Silmarillion)
Valar (J. R. R. Tolkien's The Silmarillion)
Vána (J. R. R. Tolkien's The Silmarillion)
Varda (J. R. R. Tolkien's The Silmarillion)
Virgil (Supernatural)
Virtue (Ultrakill)

W 
 Whis (Dragon Ball)
Wizards (J.R.R. Tolkien's The Lord of the Rings)

X
Xaphania  (His Dark Materials)
 Xas (The Vintner's Luck and The Angel's Cut)

Y
Yavanna (J. R. R. Tolkien's The Silmarillion)

Z
Zachariah (Supernatural)
Zadkiel (Marvel Comics)
Zauriel (DC Comics)
Zera (Spawn)

See also
Films about angels
List of demons in fiction
List of angels in theology